The South African national cricket team toured Zimbabwe in November 1999 and played a single Test match against the Zimbabwean national cricket team. The tour took place immediately after Zimbabwe had visited South Africa to play their first Test match in the country with only a fortnight separating the matches. South Africa had previously played one Test match in Zimbabwe in 1995 and had visited the country to play a single One Day International in 1992 soon after the end of the apartheid era sporting boycott of South Africa, although sides from Zimbabwe and Rhodesia had previously played in South African domestic cricket competitions, including during the apartheid era.

South Africa won the Test match convincingly, recording their biggest victory and Zimbabwe's heaviest Test defeat in the process. Later in the summer Zimbabwe returned to South Africa to play in the 2000 Standard Bank Triangular Tournament, a series of One Day Internationals against England and South Africa before England toured Zimbabwe for a four-match ODI series. The Test match was the only game South Africa played in Zimbabwe and the team returned home immediately after the match was completed.

Tour party
Following their convincing victory at Bloemfontein at the beginning of the month, the South African selectors named the same team on 2 November. The team was captained by Hansie Cronje and had twelfth man Nicky Boje as a replacement. Both Gary Kirsten and Herschelle Gibbs are unavailable as the result of injuries. The same 11 players took to the field in Harare as had done at Bloemfontein.

Zimbabwe were captained by Andy Flower following Alistair Campbell's resignation only 48 hours before the start of the match. Flower had captained the team before Campbell and was reinstated for the match. The Zimbabwean team was also unchanged from the match at Bloemfontein with key bowlers Heath Streak and Paul Strang both unavailable through injury. The team had suffered heavy defeats to Australia earlier in the summer as well as the loss at Bloemfontein and, Wisden reported, were suffering from low morale as a result of these results and an ongoing pay dispute.

Test match
The match was played at the refurbished Harare Sports Club. The toss was won by South Africa who chose to bowl first on a pitch which had "quite a bit of grass left on it" and favoured the experienced South African bowling attack.

The first day was cut short with only 23 overs possible. Writing in Wisden, Geoffrey Dean was of the view that the match began in "conditions overwhelmingly favouring the bowlers" and a combination of the conditions, the "helpful pitch" and "injudicious strokes" by Zimbabwean batsmen saw the home side bowled out for only 102 runs by lunch on day two. The total was Zimbabwe's lowest in Test matches at the time; John Ward considered that the "brilliant" bowling of the South African attack and the low confidence of Zimbabwe's batsmen as well as the pitch and conditions were the causes of the batting collapse.

South Africa scored 492 runs in reply, with centuries for Mark Boucher and Jacques Kallis. Although the pitch was still helpful to bowlers, Zimbabwe's bowling were less consistent or effective and the South African batsmen more experienced – Kallis' hundred was described as "masterful" whilst Boucher, who went in as a nightwatchman towards the end of the second day, scored 125, the highest score made by a nightwatchman in Test cricket at the time. Boucher and Shaun Pollock put on 148 runs for the eighth South African wicket, a new eighth wicket record for the country, and South Africa declared before the start of play on the fourth day, leaving Zimbabwe requiring 390 runs to make South Africa bat again with two whole days play remaining.

The Zimbabwean second innings lasted only 3 and a half hours, with the team dismissed for 148 runs. The Zimbabwean batting was described in Wisden as "dispirited and inept", although Ward considered that the South Africa's bowlers were "dominant", with Donald taking Grant Flower's wicket with an unplayable delivery with only the second ball of the innings. The result was Zimbabwe's worst defeat in Test cricket, with South Africa winning by an innings and 219 runs, their biggest Test match victory. The player of the match was awarded jointly to Boucher and Pollock.

Notes

References

1999 in South African cricket
1999 in Zimbabwean cricket
South African cricket tours of Zimbabwe
International cricket competitions from 1997–98 to 2000
Zimbabwean cricket from 1980–81 to 1999–2000